The Meitar Open was a tennis tournament for professional female players. The event was classified as a $60,000 ITF Women's Circuit tournament and was held in Meitar, Israel, 2019 on outdoor hardcourts.

Past finals

Singles

Doubles

External links
 ITF search

ITF Women's World Tennis Tour
Recurring sporting events established in 2019
Hard court tennis tournaments
Tennis tournaments in Israel
2019 establishments in Israel